Trinity Lutheran Church is a Lutheran Church–Missouri Synod (LCMS) congregation in St. Louis, Missouri, U.S. It is considered the "mother church" of the LCMS.

History 
Located at 812 Soulard Street in the Soulard neighborhood, it is the oldest Lutheran church of the contiguous United States west of the Mississippi River. Its architectural style is Gothic revival.

The church was founded in 1839 by German Lutheran immigrants from Saxony who had arrived in the United States in 1838. They traveled by boat from New Orleans to St. Louis. Much of their party soon traveled south to Perry County, Missouri; those who remained in St. Louis started a church that went for three years with neither name nor dedicated worship facility. The congregation first met at an Episcopal church at Broadway and Walnut Streets.

The Saxon Lutherans brought with them a library, church organ, and church bells. The congregation's school had roots dating to the 1830s when the Saxon children studied on their journey to the United States.

Otto Hermann Walther was inducted as the first pastor on June 9, 1839. When he died in 1841, his brother Carl Ferdinand Wilhelm Walther accepted the call to lead Trinity Lutheran. C. F. W. Walther's tenure at Trinity lasted from May 1841 until his death in 1887, during which time he also served as president of the LCMS and president of Concordia Seminary.

The first building, on Lombard Street, was dedicated in 1842. A new church at Eighth and Soulard streets was built in 1865. That building was destroyed by the 1896 St. Louis tornado. The congregation rebuilt the sanctuary on the same property and was able to incorporate the pulpit and baptismal font that had survived the tornado.

Trinity was known as the "mother church" to three other early Lutheran congregations in St. Louis; this group was called the Gesammtgemeinde, or "general congregation". The others were Immanuel (1848 – 2012) in the Greater Ville neighborhood, Holy Cross Lutheran (1858) in the Gravois Park neighborhood, and Zion Lutheran (1860) in the St. Louis Place neighborhood.

The 150th anniversary of the LCMS was celebrated at Trinity in 1997. Restoration work on one of its mahogany window frames was completed in 2008.

References

External links 

 
 Build St. Louis
1839 establishments in Missouri
Churches in St. Louis
Culture of St. Louis
Lutheran churches in Missouri
Lutheran Church–Missouri Synod churches
Religious organizations established in 1839